A tile-based game is a game that uses tiles as one of the fundamental elements of play. Traditional tile-based games use small tiles as playing pieces for gambling or entertainment games.  Some board games use tiles to create their board, giving multiple possibilities for board layout, or allowing changes in the board geometry during play.

Each tile has a back (undifferentiated) side and a face side.  Domino tiles are usually rectangular, twice as long as they are wide and at least twice as wide as they are thick, though games exist with square tiles, triangular tiles and even hexagonal tiles.

Traditional
 Anagrams
 Chinese dominoes
 Dominoes
 Khorol
 Mahjong

Commercial
 Okey
 Quad-Ominos
 Qwirkle
 Rummikub
 Scrabble

Using non-rectangular tiles
 Bendomino
 Blokus
 Gheos
 Heroscape
 Hive
 Tantrix
 Triominos

Board games
 Alhambra
 Azul (board game)
 Betrayal at House on the Hill
 Carcassonne
 Domineering
 Fjords
 Forbidden Island
 Galaxy Trucker
 Gold Mine
 Rallyman: GT
 Saboteur
 The Settlers of Catan
 Tsuro
 Tsuro Of The Seas
 Zombies!!!

See also
 Sliding puzzle